Tomás Silva may refer to:

Tomás Xavier de Lima Teles da Silva, 1st Marquis of Ponte de Lima (1727-1800), Portuguese nobleman and statesman
Tomás Silva (footballer, born 1966), Uruguayan football midfielder
Tomás Silva (footballer, born 1999), Portuguese football winger

See also
Thomas Silva, American engineer